The 1957–58 Norwegian 1. Divisjon season was the 19th season of ice hockey in Norway. Eight teams participated in the league, and Gamlebyen won the championship.

Regular season

External links 
 Norwegian Ice Hockey Federation 

Nor
GET-ligaen seasons
1957 in Norwegian sport
1958 in Norwegian sport